"Beibs in the Trap" (stylized in all lowercase) is a song by American rapper Travis Scott featuring vocals and sole production from Canadian rapper Nav. Written by the two alongside Cash XO, the track appears on the former's second studio album, Birds in the Trap Sing McKnight, which was released on September 2, 2016.

Background
"Beibs in the Trap" is a reference to Canadian singer Justin Bieber, who Scott has collaborated with on "Maria I'm Drunk", which also had Young Thug on it from Scott's debut studio album Rodeo (2015). Scott has also collaborated with Bieber on "No Sense" from Bieber's fourth studio album Purpose (2015). Scott and Bieber later collaborated on "Second Emotion" from Bieber's fifth studio album Changes (2020).

"Beibs in the Trap" could be a possible reference to American rapper Nicki Minaj's single "Beez in the Trap" (2012), featuring fellow American rapper 2 Chainz, but this is clearly a reference to Birds in the Trap Sing McKnight.

Music video
The music video for "Beibs in the Trap", directed by RJ Sanchez, premiered on December 28, 2016, via Scott's Vevo channel. It features Scott and Nav performing the song  at a hangar filled with flashing lights and models. A metallic silver Lamborghini is showcased throughout the entire video. Peter A. Berry from XXL wrote; "The lights and the models' wardrobes make this visual seem like something ripped directly from the upcoming Ghost in the Shell movie, and it looks more than a little cool." Eric Skelton of Pigeons & Planes wrote that all that is missing is "[Justin] Bieber sitting in the corner wearing metallic Hammer pants".

Commercial performance

After the release of the music video, "Beibs in the Trap" debuted at number 93 on the US Billboard Hot 100, and later reached at number 90 on the chart. The song was eventually certified 2× Platinum by the Recording Industry Association of America (RIAA) for sales of over two million copies in the United States.

Charts

Certifications

References

External links
 

2016 songs
Nav (rapper) songs
Songs written by Travis Scott
Travis Scott songs
Songs written by Nav (rapper)
Songs written by Amir Esmailian
Song recordings produced by Nav (rapper)